Don't Sweat Me is the third studio album by American rapper and producer M.C. Shy-D. It was released in 1990 via Benz Records Inc. and On Top Records. The album peaked at number 80 on the Top R&B Albums chart, and the title track single peaked at number 16 on the Hot Rap Songs chart.

Track listing

Personnel 
 Peter T. Jones – main artist, vocals, producer, executive producer, programming, arranging
 Aldrin Davis – scratches, producer, artwork
 Michael Dennis Johnson – producer, mixing, recording, arranging (track 4)
 Peter Langone – photography

Charts 

Album

Singles

References

External links 
 

1990 albums
MC Shy D albums
Albums produced by DJ Toomp